This is a list of properties and districts in Randolph County, Georgia that are listed on the National Register of Historic Places (NRHP).

Current listings

|}

References

Randolph
Buildings and structures in Randolph County, Georgia